The 1976–77 season was FC Dinamo București's 28th season in Divizia A. Dinamo dominated the championship, leading for 27 out of the 34 rounds. Dudu Georgescu won the European Golden Boot for the second time, with a record number of goals – 47, scoring 56% of the team's goals. In the UEFA Cup, Dinamo played against another "sacred monster" – AC Milan – with Fabio Capello and Collovatti on its side: 0–0 and 1–2.

Results

UEFA Cup 

First round

AC Milan won 2-1 on aggregate

Squad 

Goalkeepers: Constantin Ștefan (31 / 0); Constantin Eftimescu (3 / 0).
Defenders: Florin Cheran (34 / 3); Gabriel Sandu (29 / 1); Vasile Dobrău (26 / 3); Teodor Lucuță (19 / 0); Alexandru Sătmăreanu (34 / 5); Ladislau Ghiță (11 / 0); Marin Ion (21 / 1).
Midfielders:  Alexandru Moldovan (30 / 3); Cornel Dinu (31 / 6).
Forwards: Alexandru Custov (33 / 2); Dudu Georgescu (31 / 47); Ion Moldovan (25 / 2); Cristian Vrînceanu (25 / 0); Adalbert Rozsnyai (20 / 3); Mircea Lucescu (19 / 7); Vasile Chitaru (7 / 0); Sorin Georgescu (1 / 0).
(league appearances and goals listed in brackets)

Manager: Ion Nunweiller.

References 

 www.labtof.ro
 www.romaniansoccer.ro

1976
Association football clubs 1976–77 season
Dinamo
1977